Opposing Viewpoints is a series of books on current issues which seeks to explore the varying opinions in a balanced pros/cons debate.  The series attempts to encourage critical thinking and issue awareness by providing opposing views on contentious issues. The online versions are managed by Cengage Gale and the print versions are available through Rosen publishing.

Each book features black and white illustrations and cartoons, bibliographies, glossaries, chronologies, indexes, activities, and discussion questions.  They are published by Greenhaven Press and are heavily used in both school and public library collections.

A review of the online database, Opposing Viewpoints Resource Center, reads, "The print series has long been a staple in secondary school and young adult collections for research and debate preparation on hot topics in social studies and science." 

Christine Nasso of Greenhaven Press told Booklist, "When we learned our customers wanted series content to be made available in a fully searchable database, we responded with the Opposing Viewpoints Resource Center".

In 2017, Gale offered a Chrome extension to help students identify its Opposing Viewpoints in Context results in Google searches.

Books in the series
Abortion: Opposing Viewpoints (2002) edited by Mary E. Williams
Addiction: Opposing Viewpoints (2005) edited by Louise I. Gerdes
Adoption: Opposing Viewpoints (2002) edited by Roman Espejo
Africa: Opposing Viewpoints (2005) edited by Laura K. Egendorf
An Aging Population: Opposing Viewpoints (2002) edited by Laura K. Egendorf
AIDS: Opposing Viewpoints (2003) edited by Tamara L. Roleff
Alcohol: Opposing Viewpoints (2004) edited by Karen Balkin
America’s Youth: Opposing Viewpoints (2003) edited by Roman Espejo
Animal Experimentation: Opposing Viewpoints (2002) edited by Helen Cothran
Animal Rights: Opposing Viewpoints (1989) edited by Andrew Harnack
Atheism: Opposing Viewpoints (2009) edited by Beth Rosenthal
Biological Warfare: Opposing Viewpoints (2004) edited by William Dudley
Biomedical Ethics: Opposing Viewpoints (2003) edited by Roman Espejo
The Breakup of the Soviet Union: Opposing Viewpoints (1994) edited by William Barbour
Censorship: Opposing Viewpoints (2002) edited by Tamara L Roleff
Chemical Dependency: Opposing Viewpoints (2003) edited by Laura K. Egendorf
Child Abuse: Opposing Viewpoints (2004) edited by Louise I. Gerdes
Constructing a Life Philosophy: Opposing Viewpoints (2002)
Civil Liberties: Opposing Viewpoints (2004) edited by Auriana Ojeda
The Creation of the Constitution: Opposing Viewpoints (1995) edited by William Dudley
Crime and Criminals: Opposing Viewpoints (2005) edited by James D. Torr
Criminal Justice: Opposing Viewpoints (2004) edited by Tamara L. Roleff
Culture Wars: Opposing Viewpoints (2004) edited by Mary E. Williams
Death and Dying: Opposing Viewpoints (2003) edited by James Haley
The Death Penalty: Opposing Viewpoints (2002) edited by Mary E Williams
Discrimination: Opposing Viewpoints (2003) edited by Mary E. Williams
Domestic Violence: Opposing Viewpoints (2005) edited by David M. Haugen
Drug Abuse: Opposing Viewpoints (2005) edited by Tamara L. Roleff
Education: Opposing Viewpoints (2005) edited by Mary E. Williams
Endangered Oceans: Opposing Viewpoints (2004) edited by Louise I. Gerdes
Energy Alternatives: Opposing Viewpoints (2002) edited by Helen Cothran
Energy Alternatives: Opposing Viewpoints (2006) edited by Barbara Passero
Ethics: Opposing Viewpoints (2011) edited by Roman Espejo
Euthanasia: Opposing Viewpoints (2000)  edited by James D. Torr
The Environment: Opposing Viewpoints (2005) edited by Laura K. Egendorf
Extremist Groups: Opposing Viewpoints (2001) edited by Tamara L. Roleff
Extremist Groups : Opposing Viewpoints (2005) edited by Karen Balkin
The Family: Opposing Viewpoints (2003) edited by Auriana Ojeda
Gambling: Opposing Viewpoints (2002) edited by James D. Torr
Gangs: Opposing Viewpoints (2005) edited by William Dudley and Louise I. Gerdes
Garbage and Recycling: Opposing Viewpoints (2003) edited by Helen Cothran, (2007) edited by Mitchell Young 
Genetic Engineering: Opposing Viewpoints (2005) edited by Louise I. Gerdes
Global Resources: Opposing Viewpoints (2004) edited by Helen Cothran
Global Warming: Opposing Viewpoints (2002) edited by James Haley
Gun Control: Opposing Viewpoints (2003) edited by Helen Cothran
Hate Groups: Opposing Viewpoints (1999) edited by Tamara L. Roleff
Hate Groups: Opposing Viewpoints (2004) edited by Mary E. Williams
Health: Opposing Viewpoints (2004) edited by Auriana Ojeda
Health Care: Opposing Viewpoints (2000) edited by James D. Torr
Health Care: Opposing Viewpoints (2004) edited by Karen Balkin
The Homeless: Opposing Viewpoints (2002) edited by Jennifer A. Hurley
Homosexuality: Opposing Viewpoints (1993) edited by William Dudley
Homosexuality: Opposing Viewpoints (1999) edited by Mary E. Williams
Homosexuality: Opposing Viewpoints (2004) edited by Auriana Ojeda
Human Rights: Opposing Viewpoints (2004) edited by Laura K. Egendorf
Immigration: Opposing Viewpoints (2004) edited by Mary E. Williams
India and Pakistan: Opposing Viewpoints (2003) edited by William Dudley
The Information Revolution: Opposing Viewpoints (2004) edited by Laura K. Egendorf
Interracial America: Opposing Viewpoints (2001)
Iraq: Opposing Viewpoints (2004) edited by William Dudley
Islam: Opposing Viewpoints (2005) edited by William Dudley
Israel: Opposing Viewpoints (2005) edited by John Woodward
Japan: Opposing Viewpoints (1989) edited by William Dudley
Juvenile Crime: Opposing Viewpoints (2002) edited by Auriana Ojeda
Legal System: Opposing Viewpoints  (2003)
Male/Female Roles: Opposing Viewpoints (2005) edited by Auriana Ojeda
Mass Media: Opposing Viewpoints (2005) edited by William Dudley
Media Violence: Opposing Viewpoints (2004) edited by Louise I. Gerdes
Medicine: Opposing Viewpoints (2003) edited by Laura K. Egendorf
The Middle East: Opposing Viewpoints (2004) edited by William Dudley
National Security: Opposing Viewpoints (2003)
The New World Order: Opposing Viewpoints (1991) edited by Matthew Polesetsky
North and South Korea: Opposing Viewpoints (2003) edited by William Dudley
Opposing Viewpoints in American History, Volume I
Opposing Viewpoints in American History, Volume II
Paranormal Phenomena: Opposing Viewpoints (2003) edited by Mary E. Williams
The Political Spectrum: Opposing Viewpoints (1981) edited by David L. Bender and Bruno Leone)
Pornography: Opposing Viewpoints (2002) edited by James D. Torr
Pornography: Opposing Viewpoints (1997) Edited by Carol Wekesser
Race Relations: Opposing Viewpoints (2005) edited by James D. Torr
Religion in America: Opposing Viewpoints (2001)
Sexual Violence: Opposing Viewpoints (2003) edited by Helen CothranScience and Religion: Opposing Viewpoints (1988) edited by Janelle RohrStudents' Rights: Opposing Viewpoints (2005) edited by Jamuna CarrollThe Soviet Union: Opposing Viewpoints (1987) edited by Neal BernardsSports and Athletes: Opposing Viewpoints (2005) edited by James D. TorrSuicide: Opposing Viewpoints (2003) edited by Roman EspejoTechnology and Society: Opposing Viewpoints (2002) edited by Auriana Ojeda (Teen Dating: Opposing Viewpoints (2013) edited by Louise I. GerdesTeenage Pregnancy: Opposing Viewpoints (2003) edited by Auriana OjedaTeens at Risk: Opposing Viewpoints (2004) edited by Auriana OjedaTerrorism: Opposing Viewpoints (2000) edited by Laura K. Egendorf.Terrorism: Opposing Viewpoints (2004) edited by Laura K. Egendorf
Third World: Opposing Viewpoints (2000)
Tobacco and Smoking: Opposing Viewpoints (2005) edited by Karen Balkin
Violence: Opposing Viewpoints (2002) edited by Laura K. Egendorf
War: Opposing Viewpoints (2005) edited by Louise I. Gerdes
The War on Drugs: Opposing Viewpoints (2004) edited by Tamara L. Roleff
The War on Terrorism: Opposing Viewpoints (2005) edited by Karen Balkin
World War I: Opposing Viewpoints (1998) edited by William Dudley
Weapons of Mass Destruction: Opposing Viewpoints (2005) edited by James D. Torr
Welfare: Opposing Viewpoints (2003) edited by James Haley
Illegal Immigration: Opposing Viewpoints (2006) edited by Margaret Haerens

References

External links
Opposing Viewpoints Resource Center at the publisher's website, Gale.
Opposing Viewpoints: In Context
Opposing Viewpoints Series at the University of Nevada library.
www.rosenpublishing.com for in print Opposing Viewpoints books.

Series of non-fiction books
 
Cengage books
Critical thinking
Greenhaven Press books